Manny Pacquiao vs. Adrien Broner, was a boxing match for the WBA (Regular) welterweight championship. The event took place on January 19, 2019 at the MGM Grand Garden Arena in Las Vegas, Nevada. Pacquiao won the fight by unanimous decision and retained his WBA (Regular) welterweight title. The bout sold 400,000 pay-per-view (PPV) buys in the United States, earned an estimated  in pay-per-view revenue. The bout also produced a live gate of $6 million from 11,410 tickets sold and the final attendance was reported to be 13,025.

Background 
After Pacquiao signed with Al Haymon in October 2018, reports circulated that Broner was the front-runner to face him in January 2019. Pacquiao confirmed on October 18 that the deal was almost complete. One month later on November 19, a press conference was held in New York City to confirm the fight between Pacquiao and Broner on January 19, 2019 for the WBA (Regular) welterweight title. Pacquiao reunited with long-time trainer Freddie Roach who supervised the whole training camp while Buboy Fernandez did the mitts and physical parts of the training due to Pacquiao's concern of Roach's health. The fight took place at the MGM Grand Garden Arena in Las Vegas, Nevada and was distributed by Showtime PPV.

Fight details 
Pacquiao successfully defended his WBA (Regular) welterweight title against Broner via unanimous decision and never seemed troubled throughout the fight. In the seventh round, Pacquiao trapped Broner on the ropes and unloaded a barrage of punches that prompted Broner to tie him up. Pacquiao then continued his onslaught after the break, but Broner survived the round. In the ninth round, Pacquiao caught Broner with a huge left hand that sent Broner reeling backwards. All three judges ruled in favor of Pacquiao 117–111, 116–112, 116–112. According to CompuBox, Pacquiao landed 82 out of 197 of his power punches (42%) against Broner's 39 out of 180 power punches (22%). Total punch stats were 112 out of 568 (20%) for Pacquiao and 50 out of 295 (17%) for Broner. This marked Broner's career low for total punches landed at 50, his previous low was 90 against Jessie Vargas.

During the post-fight interview, Jim Gray asked Pacquiao if a Floyd Mayweather Jr. rematch will happen and Pacquiao answered, "Tell him to come back to the ring, and we will fight." Mayweather, who was ringside, was asked by Gray to nod at the camera if he wanted a rematch with Pacquiao but did not give an answer. Meanwhile, Broner's interview immediately went south as he claimed victory and said, "I controlled the fight. He was missing. I hit him clean more times. I beat him." He alleged that it was a setup for a Mayweather–Pacquiao rematch and accused Gray of being against him. When Gray commented that Broner had three wins, three defeats and a draw in his last seven fights, Broner told Gray, "I'm 3–3–1 in my last seven but I'll be 7–0 against you," to which Gray responded, "Well that wouldn't mean much, that's the end of this interview."

Fight card

Broadcasting 
The fight was shown live on Showtime PPV in the United States, Cignal and Sky Sports in the Philippines and free on ITV4 in the United Kingdom.

References 

2019 in boxing
Broner
2019 in Philippine sport
Boxing in Las Vegas
MGM Grand Garden Arena
January 2019 sports events in the United States
2019 in sports in Nevada